The 2018 season was Pahang's 15th season in the Malaysian Malaysia Super League since its inception in 2004.

Players

First team squad

Transfers

In 
1st leg

2nd leg

Out 
1st leg

2nd leg

Friendlies 
Thailand Pre-season Tour 2018

MB Terengganu Cup

Singapore Season-Break Tour 2018

Competitions

Malaysia Super League

League table

Results by matchday

Matches

Malaysia FA Cup

Malaysia Cup

Group stage

Knock-stage

Statistics

Appearances and goals

|-
! colspan="16" style="background:#dcdcdc; text-align:center"| Goalkeepers

|-
! colspan="16" style="background:#dcdcdc; text-align:center"| Defenders

|-
! colspan="16" style="background:#dcdcdc; text-align:center"| Midfielders

|-
! colspan="16" style="background:#dcdcdc; text-align:center"| Forwards

|-
! colspan="16" style="background:#dcdcdc; text-align:center"| Players transferred out during the season

  
|-

Clean sheets

References

External links

Sri Pahang FC
Sri Pahang FC seasons
2018 in Malaysian football
Malaysian football clubs 2018 season